The 2019 Youth World Weightlifting Championships was held at the Westgate Las Vegas in Las Vegas, United States from 8 March to 15 March 2019.

Medal overview

Men

Women

Medals tables 
Ranking by Big (Total result) medals
 

Ranking by all medals: Big (Total result) and Small (Snatch and Clean & Jerk)

Team ranking

Men

Women

Participating nations
A total of 183 competitors from 44 nations participate.

 (1)
 (3)
 (6)
 (1)
 (5)
 (1)
 (2)
 (2)
 (3)
 (2)
 (1)
 (1)
 (14)
 (2)
 (8)
 (1)
 (3)
 (5)
 (5)
 (2)
 (1)
 (1)
 (1)
 (4)
 (5)
 (1)
 (2)
 (13)
 (2)
 (10)
 (1)
 (5)
 (3)
 (1)
 (3)
 (2)
 (5)
 (2)
 (16)
 (4)
 (2)
 (20)
 (7)
 (4)

References

External links
Results
Results Book

IWF Youth World Weightlifting Championships
International sports competitions hosted by the United States
Youth World
Youth World Weightlifting Championships
Sports competitions in Las Vegas
Weightlifting in the United States
Youth World Weightlifting Championships